The 1993 All-Ireland Minor Hurling Championship was the 63rd staging of the All-Ireland Minor Hurling Championship since its establishment by the Gaelic Athletic Association in 1928. The championship began on 7 April 1993 and ended on 5 September 1993.

Galway entered the championship as the defending champions.

On 5 September 1993, Kilkenny won the championship following a 1-17 to 1-12 defeat of Galway in the All-Ireland final. This was their 16th championship title overall and their first title since 1991.

Kilkenny's Ollie O'Connor was the championship's top scorer with 5-35.

Results

Leinster Minor Hurling Championship

Quarter-final

Semi-finals

Final

Munster Minor Hurling Championship

First round

Semi-finals

Final

Ulster Minor Hurling Championship

Semi-final

Final

All-Ireland Minor Hurling Championship

Semi-finals

Final

Championship statistics

Top scorers

Top scorers overall

References

External links
 All-Ireland Minor Hurling Championship: Roll Of Honour

Minor
All-Ireland Minor Hurling Championship